Bohodukhiv railway station is a railway station in Bohodukhiv, Ukraine.

History
The railway station was built in 1878 in Bogodukhov, which was the administrative centre of Bogodukhov uyezd in Kharkov Governorate of the Russian Empire.

During World War II, in 1941 - 1943 the station was damaged as a result of Luftwaffe bombing, fighting, and German occupation. Later the station was completely restored and resumed its work.

After declaration of independence of Ukraine, the Bogodukhov railway station was renamed into Bohodukhiv railway station.

References

Sources 
 Архангельский А. С., Архангельский В. А. Железнодорожные станции СССР: Справочник. В 2-х кн. — М. : Транспорт, 1981.

Railway stations in Kharkiv Oblast
Southern Railways (Ukraine) stations